Short Letter, Long Farewell is a 1972 novel by the Austrian writer Peter Handke. It tells the story of a young Austrian writer who travels across the United States in search of his wife from whom he is estranged. The film-director John Ford appears as a character who brings resolution at the end of the road on the coast of California. His film Young Mr. Lincoln also serves as a point of reference and an antidote to the alienation experienced by the stranger crossing the States. The novel shares many themes and motifs with the film Alice in the Cities from 1974, directed by Handke's frequent collaborator Wim Wenders; the film can be seen as a response to the book.

See also
 1972 in literature
 Austrian literature

References

1972 Austrian novels
20th-century Austrian novels
German-language novels
Novels by Peter Handke
Suhrkamp Verlag books